Ampanihy Ouest is a district of Atsimo-Andrefana in Madagascar.

Municipalities
The district is further divided into 16 municipalities:

 Agnavoha
 Amboropotsy
 Ampanihy
 Androka
 Androimpana
 Ankiliabo
 Ankilimivory
 Ankiliabo
 Ankilizato
 Antaly
 Beara
 Beahitse
 Belafike
 Beroy Sud
 Ejeda
 Fotadrevo
 Gogogogo
 Itampolo
 Maniry
 Vohitany

Mining
In Fotadrevo there is presently a graphite mine under construction.

References 

Districts of Atsimo-Andrefana